The 2015 FC Kairat season is the 5th successive season that the club playing in the Kazakhstan Premier League, the highest tier of association football in Kazakhstan, since their promotion back to the top flight in 2009. As reigning Kazakhstan Cup champions, Kairat participated in the Kazakhstan Super Cup, where they lost to FC Astana on penalties. They will also play in the Europa League.

Squad

Transfers

Winter

In:

Out:

Summer

In:

Out:

Competitions

Kazakhstan Super Cup

Kazakhstan Premier League

First round

Results summary

Results by round

Results

League table

Championship round

Results summary

Results by round

Results

League table

Kazakhstan Cup

Final

UEFA Europa League

Qualifying rounds

Squad statistics

Appearances and goals

|-
|colspan="14"|Players away from Kairat on loan:
|-
|colspan="14"|Players who appeared for Kairat that left during the season:

|}

Goal scorers

Disciplinary record

Notes

References

External links
Official Site

Kairat
Kairat
FC Kairat seasons